Robert M. Fogelson (born 1937) is an American urban historian. He is an emeritus professor of history at Massachusetts Institute of Technology.

Biography 
Fogelson received his B.A. from Columbia University in 1958 and Ph.D. from Harvard University in 1964. His doctoral advisor was Oscar Handlin. Fogelson joined the MIT faculty in 1968 and his scholarship focuses on urban history and urban affairs, including rent control in New York City, the development of suburbs and downtowns, city policing and the decline of non-profit cooperative housing.

Fogelson received a Guggenheim Fellowship in 1973.

References 

1937 births
Columbia College (New York) alumni
Harvard University alumni
Massachusetts Institute of Technology faculty
American historians
Urban historians
20th-century American historians
21st-century American historians
Living people